Viöl is an Amt ("collective municipality") in the district of Nordfriesland, in Schleswig-Holstein, Germany. Its seat is in Viöl.

The Amt Viöl consists of the following municipalities:

References

Ämter in Schleswig-Holstein